Salomon Snowboards is a category of Salomon Group. Marketing for Salomon Snowboards is based in Portland, Oregon, near Mount Hood, while design and development takes place at the base of the French Alps, in Annecy, France. Salomon Snowboards produces a full line of hardgoods for men, women and children including snowboards, bindings, and boots.

History
Salomon released their first snowboard in 1997 after several years of development. The first board featured a simple single-color topsheet graphic and advanced technologies adopted from the resources of the ski experts.  The company built a strong team of pro riders including Daniel Frank and Michelle Taggert.

In 2007, Salomon Snowboards hosted their first annual Backyard Bang rail jam in Portland, Oregon. The contest aimed to bring backyard snowboarding into the city. Salomon’s Backyard Bang has since expanded globally to include contests in Denver, Tahoe, and Germany.

In 2008, the Salomon SickStick snowboard won the Volvo SportsDesign Award for Eco Design in the boardsports category. The SickStick featured Salomon’s newly patented bamboo sandwich construction process, and was driven by the goal to improve the performance of Salomon products while significantly reducing the ecological cost of snowboard production.

In 2010, Salomon Snowboards won TransWorld Snowboarding’s Team Shoot Out, in which four of the best teams in snowboarding compete simultaneously at four separate resorts across the West for the grand prize – the cover of the September issue of TransWorld Snowboarding Magazine.

Salomon has a history of supporting innovative video projects in snowboarding including the Robot Food films, TransWorld Snowboarding’s film Get Real, Absinthe Films, Videograss, and Mack Dawg Productions.

Team

External links
Official Homepage
Official Fan Page

References

Sporting goods manufacturers of the United States
Companies established in 1995
Companies based in Portland, Oregon
1995 establishments in Oregon